Cannonball Enroute is an album by the jazz saxophonist Cannonball Adderley, released on the Mercury label, featuring performances with Nat Adderley, Junior Mance, Sam Jones, and Jimmy Cobb. The album was recorded in 1957 but would only be released in 1961.

Reception 

The Allmusic review by Scott Yanow awarded the album 3 stars and states "Cannonball Adderley's Mercury albums (most of which, like this LP, are long out-of-print) find the youthful altoist trying to unsuccessfully keep his quintet with brother Nat together. Despite the powerful bop-oriented music they consistently recorded, the band would break up in a year, only to regroup with great success in 1959."

Track listing 
All compositions by Nat Adderley except as indicated
 "A Foggy Day" (George Gershwin, Ira Gershwin) - 3:49  
 "Hoppin' John" - 4:37  
 "18th Century Ballroom" (Nat Adderley, Ray Bryant) - 3:55  
 "That Funky Train" - 5:51  
 "Lover Man (Oh, Where Can You Be?)" (Jimmy Davis, Roger "Ram" Ramirez, Jimmy Sherman) - 3:56  
 "I'll Remember April" (Gene DePaul, Patricia Johnston, Don Raye) - 5:33  
 "Porky" (Julian Cannonball Adderley, Nat Adderley) - 3:58  
 "The Way You Look Tonight" (Dorothy Fields, Jerome Kern) - 4:27
Recorded at Capitol Studios in New York City on February 7 (tracks 1-3 & 5), February 8 (tracks 7 & 8), February 11 (track 4), and March 6 (track 6), 1957

Personnel 
 Cannonball Adderley - alto saxophone
 Nat Adderley – cornet 
 Junior Mance - piano
 Sam Jones - bass
 Jimmy Cobb - drums
Technical
Marvin Glick - album design

References 

1957 albums
Mercury Records albums
Cannonball Adderley albums